The Auschwitz Cross, instituted on 14 March 1985, was a Polish decoration awarded to honour survivors of Nazi German concentration camps, including Auschwitz (Auschwitz is a German name for the Polish town Oświęcim, where the camps were built by Nazi Germans).

It was awarded generally to Poles, but it was possible to award it to foreigners in special cases. It could be awarded posthumously. It ceased to be awarded in 1999. An exception was made in the case of Greta Ferusic, who was awarded it in February 2004.

Description
The award is a silver Greek cross with wide arms, 42×42 mm. The obverse shows barbed wire and camp poles; the year 1939 on the left, and 1945 on the right arm. In the center there is a red enameled triangle with the letter P, as worn by Polish nationals imprisoned in the camps. The reverse bears the inscription "PRL / WIĘŹNIOM / HITLEROWSKICH / OBOZÓW KONCENTRACYJNYCH" (People's Republic of Poland to prisoners of Nazi concentration camps).

References

External links
 The Auschwitz Cross in the collection of the Museum of New Zealand Te Papa Tongarewa

Awards established in 1985
Awards disestablished in 2004
Civil awards and decorations of Poland
Auschwitz concentration camp
1985 establishments in Poland
2004 disestablishments in Poland